
Gmina Czerwińsk nad Wisłą is a rural gmina (administrative district) in Płońsk County, Masovian Voivodeship, in east-central Poland.

Villages
Gmina Czerwińsk nad Wisłą contains the villages and settlements of Chociszewo, Czerwińsk nad Wisłą, Garwolewo, Gawarzec Dolny, Gawarzec Górny, Goławin, Goworowo, Grodziec, Janikowo, Karnkowo, Komsin, Kuchary-Skotniki, Łbowo, Miączyn, Miączynek, Nieborzyn, Nowe Przybojewo, Nowe Radzikowo, Nowy Boguszyn, Osiek, Parlin, Radzikowo Scalone, Raszewo Dworskie, Raszewo Włościańskie, Roguszyn, Sielec, Stare Przybojewo, Stare Radzikowo, Stary Boguszyn, Stobiecin, Wilkówiec, Wilkowuje, Wola, Wólka Przybójewska, Wychódźc, Zarębin and Zdziarka.

Neighbouring gminas
Gmina Czerwińsk nad Wisłą is bordered by the gminas of Brochów, Leoncin, Naruszewo, Wyszogród, Zakroczym and Załuski.

References

Polish official population figures 2006

Czerwinsk nad Wisla
Płońsk County